Maranthana is a town and market center in Pyuthan Municipality in Pyuthan, a Middle Hills district of Rapti Zone, western Nepal. The formerly Village Development Committee along with Pyuthan Khalanga, Bijubar, Dakha Kwadi, Bijaya Nagar, Dharmawati, Maranthana and Khaira was merged to form the new municipality since 18 May 2014.

Villages in this VDC

References

External links
UN map of VDC boundaries, water features and roads in Pyuthan District

Populated places in Pyuthan District